Poya  is a commune in New Caledonia, an overseas territory of France in the Pacific Ocean. The largest part of the commune (including the main settlement of Poya itself) lies in the North Province of New Caledonia, and a smaller part of the commune lies in the South Province, an odd situation resulting from the creation of New Caledonia's provinces in 1989. At the 2019 census, 2,592 of the 2,802 inhabitants of Poya lived on the North Province's side of the commune, while only 210 inhabitants lived on the South Province's side.

Climate

Poya has a tropical savanna climate (Köppen climate classification Aw).

See also
AS Poya

References

Communes of New Caledonia